WEEO may refer to:

WEEO-AM, a defunct radio station (1130 AM) licensed to serve Waynesboro, Pennsylvania, United States
WEEO-FM, a radio station (103.7 FM) licensed to serve McConnellsburg, Pennsylvania, United States
WRDD, a radio station (1480 AM) licensed to serve Shippensburg, Pennsylvania, which held the call sign WEEO from 2000 to 2021